Pilosocereus aureispinus is a species of plant in the family Cactaceae. It is endemic to Brazil.  Its natural habitats are dry savanna and rocky areas. It is threatened by habitat loss.

References

aureispinus
Cacti of South America
Endemic flora of Brazil
Data deficient plants
Taxonomy articles created by Polbot